Green Lane is a borough in Montgomery County, Pennsylvania. The population was 490 at the 2020 census. It is part of the Upper Perkiomen School District and Boyertown Area School District.

History
The William and Caroline Schall House was added to the National Register of Historic Places in 2007.

Geography
Green Lane is located at  (40.337224, -75.469300).

Demographics

As of the 2010 census, the borough was 97.4% White, 2.0% Black or African American, 0.4% Native American, and 0.2% Asian. 1.0% of the population were of Hispanic or Latino ancestry.

At the 2000 census there were 584 people, 231 households, and 164 families residing in the borough. The population density was 1,797.3 people per square mile (704.6/km2). There were 235 housing units at an average density of 723.2 per square mile (283.5/km2).  The racial makeup of the borough was 97.43% White, 1.03% African American, 0.17% Native American, and 1.37% from two or more races. Hispanic or Latino of any race were 1.03%.

There were 231 households, 32.0% had children under the age of 18 living with them, 55.0% were married couples living together, 9.1% had a female householder with no husband present, and 28.6% were non-families. 23.8% of households were made up of individuals, and 9.5% were one person aged 65 or older. The average household size was 2.53 and the average family size was 2.97.

In the borough, the population was spread out, with 24.8% under the age of 18, 9.1% from 18 to 24, 32.7% from 25 to 44, 20.7% from 45 to 64, and 12.7% 65 or older. The median age was 36 years. For every 100 females there were 103.5 males. For every 100 females age 18 and over, there were 106.1 males.

The median household income was $49,167 and the median family income  was $55,714. Males had a median income of $40,000 versus $30,500 for females. The per capita income for the borough was $21,123. About 4.9% of families and 7.4% of the population were below the poverty line, including 10.9% of those under age 18 and 8.9% of those age 69 or over.

Politics and government

Green Lane has a borough secretary, a mayor and borough council. The borough is part of the Fourth Congressional District (represented by Rep. Madeleine Dean), Pennsylvania's 147th Representative District (represented by Tracy Pennycuick) and the 24th State Senate District (represented by Sen. Bob Mensch). Green Lane's current Mayor is Lynn Wolfe.

Recreation
The eponymous Green Lane Park in northwestern Montgomery County offers .  The park contains  of paved and dirt trails that are used year-round by equestrians, walkers, and bikers.  In addition to the trails, visitors may fish, boat, or take an educational lesson at the nature center.

Transportation

Pennsylvania Route 29 and Pennsylvania Route 63 are the numbered highways serving Green Lane. PA 29 traverses the borough on a north-south alignment along Gravel Pike, while PA 63 heads east from PA 29 along Main Street.

References

External links

Borough of Green Lane

1730 establishments in Pennsylvania
Boroughs in Montgomery County, Pennsylvania
Populated places established in 1730